The Fiat A.12 was a six-cylinder liquid-cooled in-line engine with a bore of 160 mm and a stroke of 180 mm, giving a capacity of just under 22 litres, with variants producing between 245 and 300 horsepower at 1,700 rpm. The A.12 was a rather large aero engine at the time, but it was efficient and reliable. A total of 13,260 A.12s were produced between 1916 and 1919.

Variants
A.12
A.12bis

Applications

Airco DH.4
Airco DH.9
Ansaldo A.300
Breguet 14
Caproni Ca.4 
Caproni Ca.5
Caproni Ca.46
Fiat 2000 (tank)
Fiat Mephistopheles (racing car)
Fiat R.2
Fukunaga Tenryu 10
IVL A.22 Hansa
Macchi M.9
Macchi M.15
NS class airships
Pomilio PC/PD/PE
SAML S.1/S.2
Savoia-Marchetti S.55
Savoia-Pomilio SP.2
Savoia-Pomilio SP.3
SIA 7
SIA 9
SIAI S.16 
Vickers Vimy (third prototype)

Engines on display
 There is a Fiat A.12 on display at the New England Air Museum, Bradley International Airport, Windsor Locks, CT.
 The National Military Museum, Romania shows the A.12 with serial number 7395.

Specifications (A.12)

See also

References

 Gunston, Bill. (1986). World Encyclopaedia of Aero Engines. Patrick Stephens: Wellingborough. p. 62
 

A.12
1910s aircraft piston engines